Tunnel Through the Deeps (also published as A Transatlantic Tunnel, Hurrah!) is a 1972 alternate history/science fiction novel by American writer Harry Harrison. It was serialized in Analog magazine beginning in the April 1972 issue.

The title refers to the construction of a submerged floating-tube pontoon bridge/tunnel across the Atlantic Ocean in the novel.

Plot summary

In an alternative history, the United States lost the American Revolutionary War and George Washington was executed for treason. Thus, America in 1973 is still under the control of the British Empire. The divergence point between this world and our own occurred far earlier, however, when the Moors won the Battle of Las Navas de Tolosa on the Iberian peninsula, on July 16, 1212. Thus it was that Spain was unable to become unified, owing to the survival of an Islamic presence in its territory, and therefore could not finance the expedition of Christopher Columbus in 1492. Instead, it was John Cabot who discovered America, just a few years later.

The protagonist, Captain Augustine Washington, is a direct descendant of George Washington, and labors in his 'traitorous' shadow. Captain Washington and Sir Isambard Brassey-Brunel (descendant of Isambard Kingdom Brunel) get together to link the heart of the British Empire with its far-flung Atlantic colony in North America, although they fall out over Augustine's wooing of Isambard's young daughter, Iris, and as a result of disputes over engineering techniques. However, after a number of adventures the two are reconciled on Sir Isambard's deathbed, and the lovers later marry. After the completion of the tunnel, the American colonies are granted their independence.

Detective Richard Tracy also makes an appearance, as do 'Lord' Amis and 'Reverend' Aldiss. An appearance in connection with a suborbital rocket is also made by an expert (who prefers a mechanical Babbage machine for computing to the electronic kind) named Arthur C. Clarke.

See also
Pontoon bridge
Transatlantic tunnel

External links
A Transatlantic Tunnel, Hurrah! page on Official website {archived copy}
Worlds Beside Worlds (Harry Harrison describes how the book was written)
"Tunnel Vision" (real-life ideas for a Transatlantic Tunnel) {archived copy}

1972 American novels
Alternate history novels
1972 science fiction novels
Novels by Harry Harrison
Works originally published in Analog Science Fiction and Fact
Novels first published in serial form